Money for Speed is a 1933 British sports drama film directed by Bernard Vorhaus and starring John Loder, Ida Lupino, Cyril McLaglen and Moore Marriott. It is centered on the sport of speedway racing, which was at its peak of popularity at the time.

It featured speedway riders Ginger Lees, Lionel van Praag and Frank Varey, and speedway promoter Johnnie Hoskins. The film's editor David Lean had a brief appearance as a newspaper reporter.

Production and reception
The film was made by the independent company Hall Mark Productions at Wembley Studios and was distributed by United Artists. It was also released under the alternative title Daredevils of Earth. It was for many years considered a lost film, before two prints resurfaced. Along with Vorhaus' other Thirties work, the film was subject to a revival of critical interest from the 1980s onwards and is regarded as one of the most significant low-budget films of the era. It was one of the first feature films made by Vorhaus, who went on to have a notable career in British quota quickies and American supporting films.

Partial cast
 John Loder as Mitch 
 Ida Lupino as Jane 
 Cyril McLaglen as Big Bill Summers 
 Moore Marriott as Shorty 
 Marie Ault as Ma 
 David Lean as Reporter

Bibliography
 Richards, Jeffrey (ed.). The Unknown 1930s: An Alternative History of the British Cinema, 1929- 1939. I.B. Tauris & Co, 1998

External links

1933 films
1930s sports drama films
British auto racing films
British sports drama films
Motorcycle racing films
Films directed by Bernard Vorhaus
Films shot at Wembley Studios
Films with screenplays by Bernard Vorhaus
British black-and-white films
1930s English-language films
1930s British films
Quota quickies
English-language sports drama films